Ente Nazionale Italiano di Unificazione (Italian National Unification, acronym UNI) is a private non-profit association that performs regulatory activities in Italy across industrial, commercial, and service sectors, with the exception of electrical engineering and electronic competence of CEI .

The UNI is recognized by the Italian State and by the European Union, and represents Italian legislative activity at the International Standards Organization (ISO) and European Committee for Standardization (CEN).

Piero Torretta is the president of the organization.

History
The UNI was formed in 1921 with the initials "UNIM" in the face of demands for standardization of mechanical engineering at the time. At the 1928 General Confederation of Italian Industry (Confindustria) it was promoted to include all sectors of industry, becoming the current UNI.

Description
The main tasks of UNI are:

 develop new standards in collaboration with all stakeholders;
 represent Italy in standardization activities internationally (ISO) and within Europe (CEN) in order to promote the harmonization of standards;
 publish and disseminate technical standards and editorial products related to them.

The UNI also avails of federated entities for specific fields of competence. Between them in the field of standardization in the field of computer science is relevant UNINFO, which is the UNI, the areas of competence, at the ISO, the ISO / IEC JTC1 (ISO / IEC Joint Technical Committee) and the CEN.

Other federated entity UNI is the CTI, Italian Committee thermo energy and environment, which deals with the legislative activity in the areas of heating technology and the production and utilization of thermal energy, both nationally and internationally, where he, on behalf of UNI, the work of numerous groups CEN and ISO detaining, for some of these, the relative answering techniques.

The most important federated entity UNI is today the Italian Gas Committee (CIG) that deals with regulation of the sector gas, nationally and internationally and cooperates with many Italian and European institutions in the same sector. Currently this committee is working on several initiatives with strong impact on national energy issues, such as the introduction of biomethane in transport networks and distribution of natural gas, the European project on the quality of gas, the project of smart meters for natural gas.

The published standards can significantly affect the safety of workers, the public, or the environment, that the government refer to them recalling them in documents legislative and attributing to them some level of cogency.

UNI standard designation
The designation of a UNI standard shows its origin (# denotes a number):
 UNI # is used for Italian standards with primarily domestic significance or designed as a first step toward international status. 
UNI EN # is used for the Italian edition of European standards.
UNI ISO # is used for the Italian edition of ISO standards.
UNI EN ISO # is used if the standard has also been adopted as a European standard.

See also
 World Standards Day

References 

Italy
Standards organisations in Italy
Technical specifications
Organizations established in 1921
Scientific organisations based in Italy
1921 establishments in Italy